Colonel Taliaferro Preston Shaffner (1811 in Smithfield, Virginia – December 11, 1881 in Troy, New York) was an American inventor and entrepreneur who promoted telegraphy during its infancy.

An associate of Samuel Morse, Shaffner published Shaffner's Telegraph Companion, a monthly journal devoted to Morse's telegraphy, from 1854 to 1855. The Companion published articles on the history, theory, and practice of telegraphy, as well as United States Supreme Court opinions regarding Morse's patent disputes over the telegraph and Morse's own legal deposition regarding his claim to priority.

In 1851, Shaffner built a telegraph line from St. Louis, Missouri to Jefferson City. Later, he organized the North Atlantic Telegraph Company, which projected building a line from Labrador to England through Greenland, Iceland, and the Faroe Islands. An advantage of Shaffner's proposal was that none of its segments extended below water for more than 800 miles. The British government took some interest in the project, but doubts about the long cable's feasibility undermined its funding, and the line was never built.

Shaffner was chiefly self-taught. He studied law and was admitted to the bar but mainly pursued inventing. Shaffner invented several methods of blasting with nitroglycerine and other high explosives for which he received twelve patents. In 1864, he served Denmark in the Second Schleswig War. He wrote histories of the United States Civil War and was active in the Independent Order of Odd Fellows.

External links 

Shaffner's books and journals:
 Shaffner's Telegraph Companion, Vol. 1–2 (1854–1855)
 The Telegraph Manual: A Complete History and Description of the Semaphoric, Electric and Magnetic Telegraphs of Europe, Asia, Africa, and America, Ancient and Modern (1859)
 The War in America: being an Historical and Political Account of the Southern and Northern States: showing the Origin and Cause of the Present Secession War (1862)
 The Illustrated Record of the International Exhibition of the Industrial Arts and Manufactures, and the Fine Arts, of All Nations, in 1862, co-authored with Rev. William Owen (1862)
 History of the United States of America: from the Earliest Period to the Present Time (1863)

References 
This article incorporates facts obtained courtesy of the Signal Corps Association (1860–1865).

1811 births
1881 deaths
19th-century American inventors